Warrenpoint Town Football Club is a semi professional Northern Irish football club playing in the NIFL Championship. The club's home ground is Milltown, Warrenpoint.

History
The club was formed in 1987, and for the first 23 years of its existence played at regional league level. After being crowned champions of the Mid-Ulster Football League Intermediate A division in the 2009–10 season, the club was elected to Championship 2 for the first time by the Championship Committee. During their first season, they defeated Cliftonville 3–1 on penalties at Solitude in the fifth round of the 2010–11 Irish Cup – at the time, the biggest result in the club's history. It went on to become a very successful season for the club, as they adapted to the step-up to Championship 2 emphatically, winning the division by nine points and losing only one of the 30 games in the process. This secured their second consecutive promotion, elevating them to Championship 1, the second tier of Northern Irish football.

In their first season in Championship 1 they found the next step up more difficult to adapt to but still avoided relegation, finishing in 12th place – nine points clear of the relegation zone. At the start of the 2012–13 season the demise of Newry City allowed the club to inherit some of Newry's players – strengthening their squad substantially. They eventually finished as runners-up, and qualified for the promotion play-off against Donegal Celtic, who had finished second-bottom in the Premiership. Warrenpoint won the tie on the away goals rule after it ended 2–2 on aggregate, to reach the top flight for the first time in the club's history. This rounded off a very successful few years for the club, going from the Mid Ulster Football League Intermediate A division to the Premiership in only four seasons.

In their first season in the top flight, when many had expected the club to go straight back down, the club played their home fixtures at Dungannon Swifts' ground, Stangmore Park, until 30 November 2013 because their home ground did not meet Premiership criteria. During this period the ground was upgraded to top flight standard and the club managed to survive that season.

In 2014–15, the Point did not have an overall good season, finishing in 11th position and suffered a difficult time against Bangor in the Relegation Play-Off losing 2–0 in the first league at Clandeboye Park before winning 2–0 at Milltown and beating the Seasiders on penalties.

In 2015–16, Warrenpoint Town suffered a poor start to their season, being bottom of the table with just four points at Christmas. Following the sale of star striker Daniel Hughes to Cliftonville, the club received Martin Murray and Johnny McMurray from Cliftonville as part of the deal to take Hughes to Solitude. The club had a dramatic upturn in fortunes, first reaching a league cup semi final, before losing 1–0 to Cliftonville after extra-time, and in one of the biggest shocks in Irish league history, the Point beat Glentoran 4–0 at The Oval. The Point were relegated on the final day of the season. While leading 1–0 against Dungannon Swifts and needing a win to stay up, Warrenpoint defender Jordan Dane collided with Andrew Mitchell, and despite Dane falling over, referee Ross Dunlop awarded Dungannon a penalty, much to the disbelief of the home support and players.  Mitchell missed the penalty but scored on the rebound at the second attempt, to relegate Warrenpoint Town with the last kick of the game  sending them back to NIFL Championship 1.
Mid-season the following year, manager Barry Gray took the decision to step down and help the club with board matters and made the decision to appoint first team coach Matthew Tipton as manager. Tipton took the club to the top of the table in NIFL Championship 1 by Christmas time and had remarkably beaten Glenavon 3–1 in the Mid-Ulster Cup to reach their first ever Mid-Ulster Cup final. The club sealed their return to the NIFL Premiership with a 3–2 win over Institute in April 2017.

Current squad

Honours

Senior honours
NIFL Championship: 1
2016–17
Mid-Ulster Cup: 2
2016–17, 2021-22

Intermediate honours
IFA Championship 2 (level 3): 1
2010–11
Mid-Ulster Football League: 3
2000–01, 2007–08, 2009–10

References

External links
 

Association football clubs in Northern Ireland
Association football clubs in County Down
NIFL Premiership clubs
1987 establishments in Northern Ireland
Warrenpoint
Association football clubs established in 1987